Knock-Out was the eighth Bulldog Drummond novel. It was published in 1932 and written by H. C. McNeile under the pen name Sapper. It was adapted into the film Bulldog Drummond Strikes Back.

References

Bibliography

External links
 

1933 British novels
British crime novels
British novels adapted into films
English novels
Hodder & Stoughton books